Jacob William Mahler (born 10 April 2000) is a Singaporean professional footballer who plays as a centre-back for Singapore Premier League club Young Lions and the Singapore national team. Jacob is also capable of playing as a defensive-midfielder or central-midfielder.

Club career
A youth product of the National Football Academy in Singapore, Jacob moved to Young Lions FC in 2018. Jacob made his professional debut for Young Lions in a 1-3 Singapore Premier League loss to Geylang International FC on 4 July 2018.

International career
Jacob made his professional debut for the Singapore national football team in a friendly 2–0 win over Fiji on 11 September 2018. He scored his first goal for Singapore when he collected his second cap against Cambodia on 16 October 2018 in an eventual 1–2 win.

Jacob made his AFF Championship debut in the 2018 campaign on 9 November, with a 1–0 loss over Philippines.

Career statistics

Club
. Caps and goals may not be correct.

International

International goals
Scores and results list Singapore's goal tally first.

U22 International caps

U19 International caps

U19 goals
Scores and results list Singapore's goal tally first.

U16 International caps

Personal life
Born in Denmark of mixed Danish-Singaporean ancestry, Mahler represents the Singapore national team. He attended St. Joseph's Institution before graduating from Temasek Polytechnic with a Diploma in Aerospace Electronics. In 2021, he enlisted to the Singapore Army and is currently serving his two years mandatory conscription.

Honours

International
Singapore U22
 Merlion Cup: 2019

References

External links
 
 

2000 births
Living people
Temasek Polytechnic alumni
Footballers from Copenhagen
Singaporean footballers
Singapore international footballers
Danish men's footballers
Danish people of Singaporean descent
Young Lions FC players
Singapore Premier League players
Association football midfielders
Competitors at the 2019 Southeast Asian Games
Singapore youth international footballers
Southeast Asian Games competitors for Singapore